Parallels is a software company based in Bellevue, Washington; it is primarily involved in the development of virtualization software for macOS. The company has offices in 14 countries, including the United States, Germany, United Kingdom, France, Japan, China, Spain, Russia, Australia and Mauritius and has over 800 employees.

Company history 
SWSoft, a privately held server automation and virtualization software company, developed software for running data centers, particularly for web-hosting services companies and application service providers. Their Virtuozzo product was an early system-level server virtualization solution, and in 2003 they bought  Plesk, a commercial web hosting platform.

In 2004, SWsoft acquired Parallels, Inc. and Parallels Workstation for Windows and Linux 2.0 was released, with Parallels Desktop for Mac following in mid-2006. SWsoft's acquisition of Parallels was kept confidential until January 2004, two years before Parallels became mainstream. Later the same year the corporate headquarters moved from Herndon, Virginia to Renton, Washington. Historically, their primary development labs were in Moscow and Novosibirsk, Russia. Parallels was founded by Serguei Beloussov, who was born in the former Soviet Union and later emigrated to Singapore. 

At Apple's Worldwide Developers Conference 2007 in San Francisco, California, Parallels announced and demonstrated its upcoming Parallels Server for Mac.  Parallels Server for Mac will reportedly allow IT managers to run multiple server operating systems on a single Mac Xserve.

In 2007, the German company Netsys GmbH sued Parallels' German distributor Avanquest for copyright violation (see Parallels Desktop for Mac for details), then Parallels Server for Mac was announced at WWDC, and later Parallels Technology Network.

In 2008, SWsoft merged into Parallels to become one company under the Parallels branding which then acquired ModernGigabyte, LLC. Parallels Server for Mac was launched in June then in September Parallels Desktop 4 for Windows and Linux, a rename of Parallels Workstation for the 4.0 release, and Parallels Desktop 4.0 for Mac later that year. From the next version, 6.0, the Windows and Linux software became known as Parallels Workstation again.

Over the next three years, the company launched Parallels Desktop 5 for Mac, Parallels Desktop 6 for Mac, Parallels Server for Mac 4.0 Mac mini Edition, Parallels Transporter, Parallels Workstation 6 Extreme, Parallels Desktop 7 for Mac, Parallels Mobile for iOS, and Parallels Workstation 6.

During 2012, 2013 and 2014, the company discontinued Parallels Server for Mac, Windows and Linux, launched Parallels Desktop 8 for Mac and Mac Management for Microsoft System Center Configuration Manager. and released Parallels Desktop 10 for Mac.

Parallels acquired 2X Software in February 2015, rebranded their service provider business to Odin, later selling the Odin Service Automation Platform to Ingram Micro. They also released Parallels Mac Management v4.0 for Microsoft SCCM and Parallels Desktop 11 for Mac.

In 2017, Virtuozzo and Plesk, two products from the pre-Parallels history of SWsoft, were spun out.

In December 2018, Corel announced that it had acquired Parallels.

On October 20, 2020 it was announced that Google had partnered with Parallels to bring full-featured Windows applications to enterprises and cloud workers using Chrome Enterprise. "Chrome OS is increasingly being chosen by modern enterprises, either for remote work, hybrid, or in the office," said John Solomon, Vice President of ChromeOS at Google, "We are thrilled to partner with Parallels to bring legacy and full-featured Windows applications support, through Parallels Desktop for Chromebook Enterprise, to help businesses easily transition to cloud-first devices and workflows."

On February 17, 2023 Microsoft has announced its partnership with Parallels Desktop 18 to bring Windows 11 support to M-Series Macs.

Current products
 Parallels Desktop for Mac – an x86 and ARM virtualization platform for macOS.
 Parallels RAS –  an application virtualization program allowing Windows applications to be accessed via individual devices from a shared server or cloud system.
 Parallels Toolbox – a productivity suite for Windows and macOS.
 Parallels Access – a remote desktop platform allowing iOS and Android devices to connect to Windows and macOS devices.
 Parallels Desktop for ChromeOS – a Windows virtualization platform for ChromeOS.

References 

Software companies established in 1999
Software companies based in Washington (state)
Companies based in Bellevue, Washington
Virtualization software
2018 mergers and acquisitions
Corel
American subsidiaries of foreign companies
Software companies of the United States
1999 establishments in Washington (state)